C. petiti may refer to:
 Campephaga petiti, the Petit's cuckoo-shrike, a bird species
 Cottus petiti, the chub of Lez, a fish species endemic to France